Allan Silvera (born 24 November 1895, date of death unknown) was a Jamaican cricketer. He played in three first-class matches for the Jamaican cricket team in 1924/25.

See also
 List of Jamaican representative cricketers

References

External links
 

1895 births
Year of death missing
Jamaican cricketers
Jamaica cricketers
Sportspeople from Kingston, Jamaica